Anna Maria Alexandra Anstrell (born 18 December 1974) is a Swedish politician from the Moderate Party. Since 2018, she has been member of the Riksdag for Stockholm County.

She was also elected as Member of the Riksdag in September 2022.

References 

Living people
1974 births
Members of the Riksdag 2014–2018
Members of the Riksdag 2018–2022
Members of the Riksdag from the Moderate Party
21st-century Swedish politicians
21st-century Swedish women politicians
Women members of the Riksdag
Mid Sweden University alumni
Uppsala University alumni
Members of the Riksdag 2022–2026